Sebaldus (or Sebald) was an Anglo-Saxon missionary to Germany in the 9th or 10th century. He settled down as a hermit in the Reichswald near Nuremberg, of which city he is the patron saint. According to legend, Sebaldus was a hermit and a missionary.

Legends 
Almost all details of the life of Sebaldus are uncertain, beyond his presence in the woodland of Poppenreuth, west of Nuremberg which was explained by his being a hermit. However various legends about his life have been recorded.

One of the earliest legends claims Sebaldus was a contemporary of Henry III (died 1056) and was of Franconian origin. After a pilgrimage in Italy, he became a preacher at Nuremberg. Another text claims that he was a Frankish nobleman who met Willibald and Winibald in Italy (thus dating his life to the 8th century) and later became a missionary in the  that is associated with his name. Other legends claim he was either the son of the king of Denmark or a student in Paris who married a French princess, but then abandoned her on their wedding night to go on a pilgrimage to Rome. In these versions of the legend the Pope gave Sebaldus the mission of evangelising in the forests of Nuremberg, which gives his ancient presence there a papal authority.

Veneration 

Despite the obscure origins and insecure historicity of the saint himself, the cult of Sebaldus has been long associated with Nuremberg, fostered by the city itself, which became a place of pilgrimage.  The earliest existence of his cult can be dated to the late eleventh century, with a passing reference under the year 1072 in the chronicle of Lambert of Hersfeld. in 1255, he became the co-patron, with Saint Peter, of the newly rebuilt parochial church, where his tomb was venerated.

The feast day of St Sebaldus as August 19 appeared in a calendar of Olmütz of 1131–1137, and many children born in that city bore the saint's name. The relics of the saint were translated in 1397 to the new choir of the church of Saint Sebaldus, and every year his relics were carried in procession.  The kings and emperors of Germany, when in Nuremberg, customarily prayed before his reliquary.

On March 26, 1425, he was formally canonized by Pope Martin V, following a request by the Council of Nuremberg.  In 1429, florins from Nuremberg began to bear his image. A Latin  ('Life of St. Sebaldus') was written about 1480 by Sigmund Meisterlin, a peripatetic Benedictine monk who spent some time at Augsburg.

In 1508–1519, Peter Vischer the Elder and his sons fabricated the celebrated Late Gothic bronze tomb in the Church of St. Sebaldus, considered a masterpiece of the German Renaissance. The cult survived the Reformation.  In Italy, where he is venerated as San Sinibaldo, an altar was dedicated to him in the Venetian church of San Bartolomeo sul Rialto. In the same church, in 1507, Sebastiano del Piombo painted a representation of Sebald.

See also

Notes

Literature 
 Collins, David J. "The Holy Recluses." In Reforming Saints: Saints' Lives and Their Authors in Germany, 1470-1530, pp. 51–74. Oxford Studies in Historical Theology. Oxford: Oxford University Press, 2008.

External links 

  Biographisch-Bibliographisches Kirchenlexikon [Biographical-Bibliographical Church Lexicon] "Online list of volumes and current supplements: General article index" 
  Santi, Beati e Testimoni [Saints, Blesseds and Witnesses]
  Frequently asked questions on 
 Saint Sebald article in the FrankenWiki of the Nürnberger Zeitung

Date of birth unknown
Date of death unknown
German Roman Catholic saints
German hermits
People from Nuremberg
11th-century Christian saints
Benedictine saints